The Marriage of Sense and Soul: Integrating Science and Religion is a 1998 book by American author Ken Wilber. It reasons that by adopting contemplative (e.g. meditative) disciplines related to Spirit and commissioning them within a context of broad science, that "the spiritual, subjective world of ancient wisdom" could be joined "with the objective, empirical world of modern knowledge". The text further contends that integrating science and religion in this way would in turn, "have political dimensions sewn into its very fabric".

Importance

Underscoring how important the relationship between science and religion is to our unfolding world, Wilber explains that science "has given us the methods for discovering truth, while religion is the force that generates meaning". To illustrate this point, the author enlists his AQAL model to show how varying understandings of Spirit, from romanticism to idealism through postmodernism have over time, predicated humanity's own development in relation to the Big Three cultural value spheres of art (Upper Left quadrant), morals (Lower Left quadrant), and science (Right hand quadrants).

Overview

Part I: The Problem

As Roger Walsh notes in his review of the book, although there's "enormous variation from one religion to another there is also wide agreement" among academics that the Great Chain of Being can be found "at the center of virtually all major religions". Also, and because "the Great Chain of Being was" at one time "humankind's dominant worldview", "with the rise of modernity the West became the first civilization in history" to discard it. In recognizing that "each senior dimension" of the Great Chain actually envelopes or enfolds "its junior" in a manner said to "transcend and include" the previous stage however, Wilber appropriates the term 'Great Nest of Being' in visualizing "a series of concentric spheres or circles" as a holarchy reaching from matter to mind to Spirit. This three-level scheme subsequently "show(s) up as the hierarchy of earth, human, and heaven" in "even the earliest shamanic traditions", and subsequently reappears with "the Hindu and Buddhist notion of the three great states of being: gross (matter and body), subtle (mind and soul), and causal (spirit)" [emphasis in original].

Furthermore, where "the standard position of most classical religions and the religions of antiquity" had viewed science as "but one of several valid modes of knowing" having "an important and rightful place in the Great Chain of Being" alongside "theology and mysticism", this point of view "is now generally called epistemological pluralism". This perspective though too, according to Wilber, "was given perhaps its clearest statement by such Christian mystics as St. Bonaventure and Hugh of St. Victor: every human being has the eye of flesh, the eye of mind, and the eye of contemplation" [emphasis added].

As Wilber notes however, the underlying 'problem' as posed has been further obfuscated by a set of 'new paradigms' which "in effect replace the eye of contemplation with the eyes of mind and flesh". Consequently, he further clarifies that "the eye of flesh is monological; the eye of mind is dialogical; and the eye of contemplation is translogical" [emphasis added].

Likewise, but along with the Enlightenment, an entire set of values including "equality, freedom, and justice; representational and deliberative democracy, the equality of all citizens before the law; regardless of race, sex, or creed; political and civil rights (freedom of speech, religion, assembly, fair trial, etc.)"; all, gradually emerged. As a result, and because they'd "existed nowhere" on a large scale in "the premodern world", Wilber refers to these values and rights "as the dignity of modernity" [emphasis in original]. Subsequently, then, but pointing to the work of Max Weber and Jürgen Habermas, the book further contends that 'modernity' is chiefly defined by its "differentiation of the cultural value spheres" or the Big Three; "art, morals, and science; the Beautiful, the Good, and the True"; I (Upper Left quadrant), WE (Lower Left quadrant), and IT (Right hand quadrants) [emphasis added]. Yet, where this modern differentiation could be said to have begun "in earnest around the sixteenth and seventeenth centuries", "by the end of the eighteenth and the beginning of the nineteenth the differentiation was already drifting into a painful and pathological dissociation". Consequently, but in just this way, the Left-Hand or interior dimensions were ultimately "reduced to their Right-Hand or exterior correlates which utterly collapsed the Great Chain of Being, and with it, the core claims of the great wisdom traditions" [emphasis added].

Part II: Previous Attempts at Integration

Ascribing a recognition to Immanuel Kant of this "leveling and deadening of the modern monological collapse" however [emphasis added], Wilber chronicles the philosopher's subsequent attempt to integrate "moral we-wisdom with scientific it-knowledge" [emphasis added]. From this vantage point, Kant's Critique of Pure Reason is described as an affirmation that "science alone gives cognitive knowledge, "real" knowledge, and all else is nonsensical metaphysics." Likewise, his second installment, Critique of Practical Reason ferreted humanity's moral dimensions in concluding that while "(m)en and women are not free as empirical objects—in the world of ITS . . . as ethical subjects, men and women are indeed autonomous" [emphasis in original]. Further pursuing this line of thought, but utilizing the moral rationale of "ought", Kant's third critique, Critique of Judgement begins by examining the realm of aesthetics in route to ascertaining; as Wilber paraphrases it, "that the interior "ought" of moral reasoning could never get going in the first place without the postulates of a transcendental Spirit".

Consequently, but in the aftermath of Kant's contributions, the Romantics "began an intense effort to make the I-domain, the subjective domain—and especially the domain of aesthetics, sentiment, emotion, heroic self-expression, and feeling—the royal road to Spirit and the Absolute". However, because "romanticism was a philosophical revolt against rationalism" the movement "fell violent prey to" what Wilber has termed, "the pre/trans fallacy [emphasis in original], namely, the confusion of prerational with transrational simply because both are nonrational" [emphasis added].

Similarly, there also existed an ambiguity "between premodern and modern cultures" as to "the direction in which the universe" was said to be unfolding. Where a "time of creation" as recounted amongst premodern religions often entailed "a Great Spirit of one sort or another" creating "the world out of itself, or out of some prima materia", these traditions also commonly point to "a series of strange events" in which it was told, "either God began slowly to withdraw from humans, or humans withdrew from this God"; but generally depicting scenarios in which mankind inevitably "lost touch with the primal Eden". Sometime during the modern era however, this "idea of history as devolution (or a fall from God) was slowly replaced by the idea of history as evolution (or a growth toward God)". Thus, where history for premodern cultures was merely devolution, "one of the great announcements of the Idealists" asserted that "cosmic and human history" instead, was "most profoundly the evolution and development of Spirit".

Beginning then with Kant's assertion "that we can never know "the thing in itself", only the appearance or phenomenon that results when the thing in itself is acted on by the categories of the human mind" [emphasis added]; German Idealism shared much of its inception in "the notion that the world is not merely perceived but constructed." [emphasis in original] For them, "(n)ot naive empiricism, but mental idealism," was of essence in one's "perception of the world" [emphasis added]. In much this way, and to his credit, Johann Fichte is of special note in reasoning that "if you cannot know anything at all about the thing in itself" then ultimately, self-consciousness too is a social phenomena .

Consequently, too, but in sublimating these same lines of thought, Wilber delineates three principal features of spiritual evolution:

1. Involution. This original "descent" of Spirit "is a forgetting, a fall, a self-alienation of Spirit".
2. Evolution. In this "second major stage of development, Spirit evolves from objective Nature to subjective Mind" [emphasis added].
3. Nondual Spirit. Spirit comes to know "itself objectively as Nature; knows itself subjectively as Mind; and knows itself absolutely as Spirit—the Source, the Summit, the Ground and the Process of the entire ordeal" [emphasis added].

Thus, he subsequently notes that "for both Schelling and Hegel, Spirit goes out of itself to produce objective Nature, awakens to itself in subjective Mind, then recovers itself in pure nondual Spirit, where subject and object are one pure act of nondual consciousness that unifies both Nature and Mind in realized Spirit" [emphasis added]. Unfortunately, yet underscoring Idealism's remarkable percipience in discerning "the integration of empirical evolution with transcendental Spirit" as reflecting "Spirit-in-action"; "it possessed no yoga—that is, no tried and tested practice for reliably reproducing the transpersonal and superconscious insights that formed the very core of the great Idealist vision". Furthermore, and "because the Idealists lacked a genuine spiritual injunction (practice, exemplar, paradigm), they were indeed, at least in this respect, caught in "mere metaphysics"". Consequently then, and "lacking the means of consistently delivering direct spiritual experience—Idealism in this regard degenerated into abstract speculations without the means of experiential confirmation or rejection" [emphasis in original]. Simply because "every holon has a Left- and a Right-Hand dimension, and therefore every holon without exception has an objective (Right) and an interpretive (Left) component" [emphasis added], postmodernism would ultimately assume "the great and nobel" aim of introducing "interpretation as an intrinsic aspect of the Kosmos" [emphasis in original].

Yet, and for "postmodernism, this moment of truth—every actual occasion has
an interpretive component—was taken to absurd and self-defeating extremes" leading to a facile reasoning that since "(t)here is nothing but interpretation", dispensing "with the objective component of truth" at times, merely serves as practical convenience. Disconcertingly though, "(t)his extreme denial of any sort of objective truth" has subsequently amounted "to a denial of the Right-Hand quadrants altogether, precisely the reverse disaster of modernity" [emphasis in original].

For this reason perhaps, Wilber cites the relevance of three core assumptions which underlie postmodern expression in the form(s) of constructivism, contextualism, and integral-aperspectival as all, coming "to the fore with the linguistic turn" [emphasis added]. Similarly too, and crediting Jean Gebser for coining the term 'integral-aperspectival', Wilber further elucidates the word's meaning as a "pluralistic or multiple-perspectives view" privileging "no single perspective" but which in turn, affords "a more holistic or integral" vantage point. Enlisting the same term somewhat interchangeably with "vision-logic or network-logic" [emphasis in original], Wilber recognizes Ferdinand de Saussure for taking vision-logic and applying "it to language, thus disclosing, for the first time in history, its network structure." Likewise, he further asserts "(t)he linguistic turn is, at bottom, vision-logic looking at language itself" [emphasis added].

Nonetheless, but "(s)tarting from the admirable reliance on vision-logic and integral-aperspectival awareness—yet still unable to escape the collapse of the Kosmos—these postmodern movements ended up subtly embodying and even extending the reductionistic nightmare". Serving as an example of this, and referring to William H. Gass's, The Tunnel as epitomizing what many claim "to be the ultimate postmodern novel", Wilber voices accord with RobertAlter's view that the book's defining strategy is reflected through the manner in which "everything is deliberately reduced to the flattest surface." Thus Gass's text is said to do this by "denying the possibility of making consequential distinctions between, or meaningful ranking of, moral or aesthetic values. There is no within: murderer and victim, lover and onanist, altruist and bigot, dissolve into the same ineluctable slime". Thus Wilber subsequently concludes that "under the intense gravity of flatland, integral-aperspectival awareness became simply aperspectival madness—the contradictory belief that no belief is better than any other—a total paralysis of thought, will, and action in the face of a million perspectives all given exactly the same depth, namely, zero" [emphasis added].

Part III: A Reconciliation

Consequently, and because "(a) modern and postmodern spirituality has continued to elude us," Wilber poses his vision for a spirituality capable of standing "up to scientific authority . . . by announcing its own means and modes, data and evidence, validates and verifications". Along these same lines, the author subsequently outlines what he regards as empirical science's two primary objections to an integration of science and religion:

 That "there are no irreducible interior domains that can be studied by different modes of knowing, there are only objective ITS (atomistic or holistic) studied best by science. In short, interior domains have no reality of their own; thus there are no "interior" modes of knowing that cannot be explained away, literally."
 "Even if there were other modes of knowing than the sensory-empirical, they would have no mean of validation and thus could not be taken seriously."

In addressing the first objection Wilber reasons that if "empirical science rejects the validity of any and all forms of interior apprehension and knowledge, then it" must also reject "its own validity as well". This is so because "a great deal" of this knowledge itself, already "rests on interior structures and apprehensions that are not delivered by" and hence can't be confirmed by, "the senses (such as logic and mathematics, to name only two)." Likewise, "(i)f science acknowledges these interior apprehensions, upon which its own operations depend, then it cannot object to interior knowledge per se. It cannot toss all interiors into the garbage can without tossing itself with it."

Similarly, Wilber asserts "(o)bjection number 2 can be answered by showing that the scientific method, in general consists of three basic strands of knowing (injunction, apprehension, confirmation/rejection). If it can be shown that the genuine interior modes of knowing also follow these same three strands, then objection number 2 . . . would be substantially refuted" [emphasis in original]. In this way, and "(w)ith the two major scientific objections to the interior domains undone", "a genuine reconciliation of science and religion (and the Big Three in general)" is afforded practical viability [emphasis added].

For these reasons, Wilber subsequently deduces that "sensory empiricism" cannot be included as one of "the defining characteristics of the scientific method", arguing that the "defining patterns of scientific knowledge" instead, "must be able to embrace both biology and mathematics, both geology and anthropology, both physics and logic—some of which are sensory-empirical, some of which are not." In this same regard however, he notes "there is sensory empiricism (of the sensorimotor world)" or empiricism in the narrow sense, "mental empiricism (including logic, mathematics, semiotics, phenomenology, and hermeneutics), and spiritual empiricism (experiential mysticism, spiritual experiences)" or empiricism in the broad sense. "In other words, there is evidence seen by the eye of flesh (e.g., intrinsic features of the sensorimotor world), evidence seen by the eye of mind (e.g., mathematics and logic and symbolic interpretations), and evidence seen by the eye of contemplation (e.g., satori, nirvikalpa samadhi, gnosis)" [emphasis in original].

Wilber then outlines what he states as believing "are three of the essential aspects of scientific inquiry"; referring to them as the "three strands of all valid knowing":

1. Instrumental injunction. "This is an actual practice, an exemplar, a paradigm, an experiment, an ordinance. It is always of the form "If you want to know this, do this."
2. Direct apprehension. "This is an immediate experience of the domain brought forth by the injunction; that is, a direct experience or apprehension of data (even if the data is mediated, at the moment of experience it is immediately apprehended)."
3. Communal confirmation (or rejection). "This is a checking of the results—the data, the evidence—with others who have adequately completed the injunctive and apprehensive strands" [emphasis added].

Advocating that science "expand from narrow empiricism (sensory experience only) to broad empiricism (direct experience in general) [emphasis added], Wilber similarly reasons that religion too "must open its truth claims to direct verification—or rejection—by experiential evidence." He subsequently asserts that "(r)eligion, like science, will have to engage the three strands of all valid knowledge and anchor its claims in direct experience" [emphasis added].

Likewise, Wilber contends that "in the modern and postmodern world", religion "will rest on its unique strength—namely, contemplation" or serve to merely "support a premodern, predifferentiated level of development in its own adherents: not (as) an engine of growth and transformation, but (as) a regressive, antiliberal, reactionary force of lesser engagements". He subsequently observes that "(i)f religion possesses something that is uniquely its own, it is contemplation" [emphasis in original]. Moreover, though, "it is the eye of contemplation adequately employed, that follows all three strands of valid knowing" [emphasis added]. "Thus religion's great, enduring, and unique strength is that, at its core, it is a science of spiritual experience (using "science" in the broad sense as direct experience, in any domain, that submits to the three strands of injunction, data, and falsifiability)" [emphasis in original].

In this same way, but "namely, to find some scheme that could accommodate both premodern and modern worldviews, and thus integrate religion and science"; because "the core of premodern religion was the Great Chain, and since the essence of modernity was the differentiation of the value spheres (the Big Three or the four quadrants)" [emphasis added], Wilber's text claims to accomplish a reintegration of religion and science by conjoining "the Great Chain with the four quadrants" [emphasis in original].

Part IV: The Path Ahead
Wilber similarly notes however, that "(w)hat needs to be integrated is not the dissociations but the differentiations of modernity, for not only do these define the dignity of modernity [emphasis added], they are an irreversible part of the evolutionary process of differentiation-and-integration" [emphasis in original]. Also, but by virtue of the likelihood that this "future evolution" proves to be a "process of collectively unfolding the yet higher stages of the Great Chain, as it has already unfolded the lower", Wilber envisions too that "real religion—genuine spirituality and the deep sciences of the interior" could subsequently serve "an unprecedented role as the vanguard of evolution, the growing tip of the universal organism, growing toward its own highest potentials, namely, the ever-unfolding realization and actualization of Spirit [emphasis added]".

For this reason too, and because "(t)raditional conservatism is "in many ways" adduced as being "anchored in premodern worldviews . . . whereas liberalism is largely anchored in the rational differentiations of modernity", Wilber envisages an integration of religion and science as opening "up the possibility of a significant reconciliation of conservative and liberal views". Prospects for this harmonization are further expressed as the means by which transrational awareness [emphasis added], "standing within the political freedom—the liberal freedom—offered by the Enlightenment . . . moves into its own higher estate by pursuing Spiritual Enlightenment, which it then offers, within that same political freedom, to any and all who desire to be released from the chains of space and time, self and suffering, hope and fear, death and wonder" [emphasis in original]. This "politics of meaning" then, in "its own spiritual realization" is "thoroughly transliberal, bringing together the Enlightenment of the East with the Enlightenment of the West" [emphasis added].

Criticism
Reflecting an array of impassioned thought concerning a demarcation problem in the relationship between religion and science, The Marriage of Sense and Soul has spawned a range of intellectual response; both affirming and derogatory. Included among these many views was that of Dutch author Frank Visser who published an article addressing the book's detractors. From his perspective, Wilber's tome had "alarmed several critics, not too familiar with [the author's] works" even though (or perhaps, because) it represents "a view of reality which is large enough to absorb ANY conclusion of science—be it natural, human or spiritual—without giving science the last word" [emphasis added].

In response to Visser's piece, Wilber drafted a reply of his own saying that his "critics have completely missed" one "simple but essential point"; that was, by assuming "that in expanding science to include the higher realms", they'd inferred he was "somehow reducing the higher realms to science." This misconception is negated in the fact however, that "even with an expanded definition of science", he never reduces "the higher realms to science only, for there are the art and morals and science of the higher realms. And the art and morals have different specific methodologies than the sciences, as" he'd already explained in length [emphasis added].

See also
Constructive empiricism
Constructivism
Contextualism
Integral theory
Integral (spirituality)
Involution
Jürgen Habermas
Phenomenology
Relationship between religion and science
Signifier (floating)
Validity (disambiguation)

Notes

References

External links
 "The Development of Absolute Idealism"
 The Marriage of Sense and Soul (book review)
 "Unique Self Dialogue: Ken Wilber & Marc Gafni, Part 1"

1998 non-fiction books
American non-fiction books
Books by Ken Wilber
English-language books
Broadway Books books